NWA Canadian Championship of pro-wrestling may refer to:

 NWA Canadian Television Championship
 NWA Canadian Women's Championship
 NWA Canadian Tag Team Championship
 NWA Canadian Tag Team Championship (Vancouver version)
 NWA Canadian Open Tag Team Championship
 NWA Canadian Heavyweight Championship (Calgary version)
 NWA Canadian Heavyweight Championship (Halifax version)